Karol Durski-Trzaska (1849–1935) was an officer in the Austro-Hungarian Army and later, Polish Army. Reached the rank of Lieutenant General (Feldmarschalleutnant) in Austrian-Hungarian Army; commander of Austrian Polish Legions in World War I from 23 September 1914 to December 1915. Transferred to reserve afterwards. He served in the Polish Army from 1919 to 1922, in reserve again afterwards. Recipient of the Silver Cross of the Order of Polonia Restituta and the Commander's Cross of the Polonia Restituta.

References

1849 births
1935 deaths
Austro-Hungarian generals
Polish legionnaires (World War I)
Polish Army officers
Polish generals in other armies
Recipients of the Silver Cross of the Virtuti Militari
Commanders of the Order of Polonia Restituta